"Le Jazz Hot!" is a song from the 1982 musical film Victor/Victoria. It is sung by Victor/Victoria, performed by Julie Andrews in both the film and the original Broadway cast. Le Jazz Hot was also choreographed by Katherine Dunham.

Synopsis
The song featured Victor/Victoria's debut to the world and the stage is themed with a piano and backup dancers. Victoria successfully fools the audience into believing that she is a male drag queen.

The Los Angeles Times explained:

Critical reception
Variety wrote "Victor’s debut, the sizzling "Le Jazz Hot", is a brassy, slinky tribute to New Orleans jazz, choreographed by Rob Marshall with tremendous energy." TV Guide deemed it "the film's one good number".Adelaide Theatre Guide called it "stylishly flattering". The LA Times wrote: "'Le Jazz Hot,' Andrews' big number in the first act, is a song that says nothing, but allows her to sing and look good while decked out in fringe and glitter". Hi-Def Digest said the song had "electrifying excitement".

Cover versions
In the second season of television series Glee, the song is covered by the character Kurt Hummel, played by Chris Colfer.

References

Songs about jazz
Songs written for films
Songs with music by Henry Mancini
Songs written by Leslie Bricusse
1982 songs